Free Public Library, Upper Montclair Branch is located in Montclair, Essex County, New Jersey, United States. The building was built in 1914 and still serves as a Bellevue Branch of the Montclair Public Library. It is listed on the state and federal registers of historic places.

See also
National Register of Historic Places listings in Essex County, New Jersey
List of Carnegie libraries in New Jersey
East Orange Public Library

References

Library buildings completed in 1914
Neoclassical architecture in New Jersey
Buildings and structures in Essex County, New Jersey
Libraries on the National Register of Historic Places in New Jersey
Carnegie libraries in New Jersey
Montclair, New Jersey
National Register of Historic Places in Essex County, New Jersey
New Jersey Register of Historic Places